Golden is an unincorporated community in Wood County, Texas, at the intersection of Farm to Market Roads 1799 and 779 off U.S. Highway 69 approximately four miles northwest of the city of Mineola, in the southwestern section of Wood County. It's eighty miles east of downtown Dallas.

Early history
The Golden area was settled initially as early as 1865. The community wasn't formally formed until the late 1870s, when a sawmill was constructed by C.W. Tucker.

The Missouri, Kansas and Texas Railroad built through Golden in 1881 on its Greenville to Mineola line. The town was named after railway construction engineer John Golden. The railroad tie cutting industry added to the local agrarian economy.

The Friendship school was established around 1880, and may have previously been part of a community of the same name.

By 1885, Golden had a post office, and the community had a population of 100 by 1890. A bank opened in the city in 1907. The community had a population zenith of 650 in 1914 and boasted a telephone connection, and the Golden Rule, a community newspaper.

Decline 
By 1925, population had dwindled to 400. The bank closed in 1931. The Golden School District reported 232 students in 11 grades by 1932. Population continued to fall throughout the middle of the 20th century. In 1965, the railroad abandoned its line through Golden. The Golden schools ultimately merged with Alba schools to form Alba-Golden ISD.

Sweet Potato Festival 
Every fourth Saturday in October since 1982, the town hosts a Sweet Potato Festival. This celebration has been featured twice on The Oprah Winfrey Show.

Education
Public education in the community of Golden is provided by the Alba-Golden Independent School District.

Notable people
 Kacey Musgraves (b. 1988), Grammy-winning country music artist, singer, and songwriter.
 Harold Simmons (May 13, 1931 – December 28, 2013), businessman, owner of Contran Corporation.

References

Sources
Golden, Texas at Texas Escapes
Sweet Potato at Golden Sweet Potato Festival

Unincorporated communities in Wood County, Texas
Unincorporated communities in Texas